Standing Committee of China may refer to:
 Standing Committee of the National People's Congress
 Politburo Standing Committee of the Communist Party of China